
This is a list of golfers who graduated from the Korn Ferry Tour and Korn Ferry Tour Finals in 2022. The top 25 players on the 2022 Korn Ferry Tour regular-season points list earned PGA Tour cards for 2022–23. The Finals determined the other 25 players to earn PGA Tour cards and the initial priority order of all 50.

As in previous seasons, the Finals featured the top 75 players on the Korn Ferry Tour regular-season points list, players ranked 126–200 on the PGA Tour's regular-season FedEx Cup points list (except players exempt through other means), non-members of the PGA Tour with enough regular-season FedEx Cup points to place 126–200, and special medical exemptions. Players who had resigned or been suspended due to participation in LIV Golf were removed from the FedEx Cup and Korn Ferry Tour points lists before the Finals. On September 2, six players who were competing in LIV Golf Invitational Boston were retroactively removed from the FedEx Cup points list, elevating several players who competed in the Finals into the top 125 and fully-exempt PGA Tour status; these players were removed from the Finals points list. 

To determine the initial 2022–23 PGA Tour priority rank, the 25 Korn Ferry Tour regular-season graduates will be alternated with the 25 Finals graduates. This priority order will then be reshuffled several times during the 2022–23 season based on the FedEx Cup standings. Justin Suh is fully exempt for the 2022–23 PGA Tour season after leading both the full-season and Finals points lists.

*PGA Tour rookie in 2022–23
†First-time PGA Tour member in 2022–23, but ineligible for rookie status due to having played eight or more PGA Tour events as a professional in a previous season
 Earned spot in Finals through PGA Tour.
 Earned spot in Finals through FedEx Cup points earned as a PGA Tour non-member.
 Indicates whether the player earned his card through the regular season or through the Finals.

FedEx Cup rankings reflect the removal of LIV Golf Invitational Boston competitors.

Runner-up finishes on the PGA Tour in 2022–23

References

External links
Korn Ferry Tour official site

Korn Ferry Tour
PGA Tour
Korn Ferry Tour Finals graduates
Korn Ferry Tour Finals graduates